Elkton is an unincorporated community in central Alberta in Mountain View County, located  west of the Cowboy Trail,  northwest of Airdrie, between the towns of Sundre and Cremona.

A post office was operational in Elkton from June 1907 to March 1969. A community hall is established in the settlement.

References 

Localities in Mountain View County